The group stage of the 1998–99 UEFA Champions League began on 16 September 1998 and ended on 9 December 1998. Eight teams qualified automatically for the group stage, while 16 more qualified via a preliminary round. The 24 teams were divided into six groups of four, and the teams in each group played against each other on a home-and-away basis, meaning that each team played a total of six group matches. For each win, teams were awarded three points, with one point awarded for each draw.

Seeding
Seeding was based on the UEFA associations 1998 ranking, similarly to the previous season. Title holders and champions of nations ranked 1–5 were put in the Pot 1. Champions of nations ranked 6–7 as well as runners-up of nations ranked 1–5 (except France) formed Pot 2. The remaining qualified runners-up (from the nations 6–8) and champions of top three nations ranked below 7 formed Pot 3. Finally, the remaining six national champions formed Pot 4.

Groups
Times are CET/CEST, as listed by UEFA (local times are in parentheses)

Group A

Group B

Group C

Group D

Group E

Group F

Ranking of second-placed teams

Notes

References

Group Stage
1998-99